Looking for Group is a fantasy-themed Canadian webcomic written by Ryan Sohmer and drawn by Lar DeSouza. The comic follows the adventures of Cale'Anon (an elven hunter) and Richard (an undead warlock), as well as their companions. Since its launch on November 26, 2006, it has received positive attention at Stratics and by the World of Warcraft community.

Overview 
Looking for Groups Ryan Sohmer (the author of Least I Could Do) and Lar deSouza (the artist of Least I Could Do) draw the themes of Looking for Group from many influences, such as Terry Goodkind's Sword of Truth series,"Dungeons and Dragons", Robert Jordan's The Wheel of Time series, George R. R. Martin's A Song of Ice and Fire (with several acknowledged news posts of this), and Blizzard Entertainment's popular MMORPG video game World of Warcraft.  The art style and the title imply that it was originally intended as a parody of World of Warcraft - the four main characters resemble four of the Horde races in World of Warcraft. Though the comic began as purely humorous in tone, it soon shifted to a more serious (albeit complicated) adventure, with most of the remaining comedy carried by Richard the warlock. A recurring gag in the comic features characters resembling famous fantasy characters such as Frodo Baggins, Obi Wan Kenobi and a Smurf appearing and then immediately being killed. Dialogue from The Lord of the Rings is often parodied, and pop culture references in medieval guise abound. The comic is currently updated twice a week, on Mondays and Thursdays.

 Characters 

Cale'Anon Vatay
Cale'Anon Vatay, or Cale to his friends, is an elven hunter and central figure of the group. Cale was a student in a place called "The Beacon of Hope" where elves like Cale learn how to protect innocents. While his people have never been seen (at least not in "modern" times) they have been described on several occasions as notoriously evil while Cale himself is seen as noble and virtuous to the point of naivete. After an accidental meeting with the less morally upstanding Richard (and additional company) he has since personally killed one innocent (accidentally) and at least two 'protectors of the people' along with many others. He lost a measure of his innocence when he released Kethenecia from its anchor, as it required that he kill a small boy (the boy in fact was not a boy at all but the Archmage of Kethenecia nor was he actually killed by Cale, though Cale came to know so after a long time, when Richard confronts the Archmage) and has grown more emotionally as he has found himself organizing and leading the Northern Tribes into a war against the Legaran Empire. Cale has proven an excellent fighter, skilled with both his twin swords and archery, as well as extremely fit- he is able to run without stopping for two days. He has also proven fast enough to snatch a crossbow bolt out of the air and strong enough to hurl it back at the attacker with deadly accuracy and force. Cale can, when needed, be an assertive leader. As the series has progressed Cale has begun to gain more depth and grow used to Richard's gruesome sense of humor. He is fiercely loyal, breaking laws and risking death to protect his friends and allies.

In many ways, Cale is very similar to a D&D hero Drizzt Do'Urden, though Ryan Sohmer has stated that when Cale was created he did not know who Drizzt Do'Urden was and the parody was unintentional. Cale has also been referred to as female by others on more than one occasion. In one of the story arcs, it has been strongly suggested that Cale's troubles and trials in this story are in preparation for his becoming "King", specifically of Kethenecia.

Recently, he liberated the "Sons of Exile" and led them, along with Richard, Pella, Captain Tah'vraay and Benn'Joon into battle. After missing the initial battle he led Benn'Joon and Pella to Mechastone, the mountain of Toyk and the gnomes which is being invading by the Black Dwarves. Toyk is reluctant to join with Cale and break out of Mechastone. Ray'd and the Bloodrage declared their allegiance to Cale, recognizing him as King of Kethenecia.

To save the gnomes and cover their retreat from Mechastone, Pella and Richard blew up the mountain.  Cale himself was nearly killed by the Black Dwarves but was saved by Richard who stuffed Cale's body into the body of a dwarf and encased it in ice to save him from the approaching lava.  Later, while recovering, Cale became romantically involved with Benn'Joon.

While attempting to find the way to Kethenecia through the mystical Portals, Cale was confronted with the vision of an elven woman named Shora whom Cale claimed was his wife. The vision was then scattered by Richard. In exploring Cale's backstory, it is revealed that he lived in a fortress-slash-monastery where he trained in isolation. After rescuing Shora from a troll assault, he marries her in secret as it is against the laws of his sect. Upon discovering their union, Cale's master frames Shora as being unfaithful in front of Cale, driving him from the monastery and out into the world. After murdering Shora to prevent Cale from ever returning, it is revealed to be part of a wider plot to have Cale fulfil his destiny as ruler of Kethenecia, engineered in part by Richard, who takes the role of Cale's guardian.

Returning to Kethenecia, the city is fortified, but isn't deemed strong enough to withstand the legion. Cale, wielding the twin blades Good and Evil, reforged from the Blade of Truth by Pella, sets out to gain the allegiance of the sand dragons that used to protect Kethenecia.

Sooba
Sooba is a large black feline companion of Cale's. When Sooba is summoned by name, she is able to appear at Cale's side within seconds, whether or not she was anywhere in sight (even in a panoramic view of the battlefield) prior to being called.  Sooba was originally Shora's pet and for reasons unknown went with Cale when he left, although it may be inferred that Sooba followed him since Shora was killed.  Sooba is a powerful fighter and has a high degree of sentience. She clearly understands verbal orders and has developed a catch-phrase of sorts, as she begins some missions or fights with the internal monologue of "You think you know me..."

Sooba has a strong liking for Richard, listening to him as much as, if not more so, than Cale. She has also served as a mount for Richard in at least two comics, an honor awarded to other characters only when it will amuse Richard.  While riding into battle atop a dragon (episode 453), Sooba serves as Richard's mount, and Cale asks Richard "Didn't he used to be my pet?" (note that Cale is unaware of Sooba's true gender) - indicating that Cale has noticed Sooba's fluctuating loyalty.
Sooba's ability to be summoned from nowhere is a reference to both the ranger class's animal companion from Dungeons & Dragons, and the mount/pet of the hunter class from World of Warcraft, both of which Sohmer has stated having been an avid player of. She is also an "accidental reference" to Guenhwyvar, a black panther owned by Drizzt Do'Urden, by default of being a parody of the Ranger's Animal Companion.

Richard
An undead warlock who willfully sows destruction without any provocation whatsoever, Richard is Cale's character foil and serves as the strip's comic relief. He is depicted as manipulative, powerful, physically strong (he is shown carrying a full grown panther or - in at least one instance - Cale himself, in one comic he managed to make a human pyramid out of his fallen enemies, and attacking and destroying enemies without any use of his magical powers), exceedingly evil and childish. Richard's magical ability is practically limitless as he has only been bested magically once to date and that was against an entire company of battle mages and judging by the destruction caused by this battle, it wasn't all one way, though he has been occasionally caught unawares by warriors, such as when Cale struck an arrow through his spine or he was decapitated by the Knights of the Way from behind.

Richard is very sensitive about his less-than-threatening name and reacts aggressively to Cale's nickname for him - "Dick", although he has used it himself on occasion. His companions often react mildly to his frequently psychopathic activities. His titles include Chief Warlock of the Brothers of Darkness, Lord of the Thirteen Hells, Master of the Bones, Emperor of the Black, Lord of the Undead, Lord of the Dance (nominated by himself on a whim), Mistress of Magma (gained by killing the former holder of the title), King of the world (also nominated by himself on a whim)  and mayor of a little village up the coast. It was later revealed that Richard's village is populated with undead beings just as violent and physically powerful as Richard. The aforementioned village was also later revealed to be the source of Richard's power. Richard seems to be able to restore his powers by interacting with his father's corpse hidden in a secret crypt within the village. The village has since been relocated to Kethenecia.

During a court trial held in an empty area Richard had been banished to by the Sisters, the judge referred to Richard's mortal self as "Lord Ashendale", hinting at his "real name". Later Maikos refers to him as "Lord Mayor," reaffirming his claim to be mayor of a village.

Due to being undead, Richard can sustain normally serious injuries without dying or experiencing pain. A running gag in the series, in fact, is Richard being impaled by a sharp object (usually daggers or arrows) thrown at him from off screen. He is also surprisingly lightweight, as evidenced by Cale's ability to shoot an arrow with Richard attached to it into the sky with little effort and to carry him on his back long distances or by the fact that he was flown as a kite (As Cale'anon exclaims, "It's a Dick on a Stick!"). Richard may also possess a wide variety of beings using a ruby amulet. He has used this to possess Sooba the panther, Cale the elf and a stone golem.

Richard claims to be traveling with Cale out of sheer boredom and for new opportunities to kill. He used to travel with a companion, an imp named Hctib Elttil (Little Bitch if read backwards), which ran away when it grew tired of being abused. In addition to his prodigious magical power, Richard was shown to be skilled enough in hand-to-hand combat to easily take out several trolls within seconds, and in one instance successfully defeating a bear while both of his arms had been removed (which he somehow attached the bear's arms to himself thus becoming a "Bear-Lock".) Richard claims that he once drained the soul of a monk, which tasted like chocolate.  Richard has stated that he has been "alive" for hundreds of years.  During this time he had forgotten most of his previous life, though some memories are now returning and apparently changing him.

Richard seems to have as much control over Sooba as Cale himself, if not more. Richard has "adopted" a Bunny (named Fel Bunny). It is implied there may be some additional motivation within him, aside from senseless killing. The Phares, elemental spirits whom Richard channeled when saving a village, noted that they saw another presence behind the darkness, which Richard shrugged off by saying "I'm very deep." While on trial he stated that, like Cale, he was on a path he was compelled to follow and after killing most of the court, he left stating that for the first time in hundreds of years he had a goal. Later, when being shown visions in the portal, his is of a little boy looking after some flowers. The boy "Lord Richard" is called in to dinner- when questioned by Cale, Richard dismisses it.

Richard also has the capacity to perform uncharacteristically good deeds, but has to look around to make sure no one is watching. He seems particularly likely to do this for Cale, for whom he seems to have a well hidden soft spot. On a number of occasions however, Cale has had to offer Richard something. When he asked Richard to save a village of people, Richard replied "I don't 'Save'", until Cale said that afterward they were going to go and cut a path of slaughter and destruction through Legarion forces, to which Richard immediately strikes a heroic pose and proclaims "We need to save these people!" For instance, when Cale had his throat slashed by a Black Dwarf, Richard used a fire spell to cauterize the wound and carries Cale away from the mountain, despite his frequent assertions that he never saves anyone. He has also saved the life of a small boy for no good reason as well as saving an entire village from flooding at Cale's request. He can also be seen as strangely naïve after commenting that he thinks he hears Benn'Joon getting hurt in the distance by Cale when actually they made love just after kissing passionately. Characteristically he assumes that Cale was hurting her and offered to bury the corpse.

Richard has admitted to murdering his father, as he reminisces on the first page. Richard was once called to task for this by a tribunal of what appeared to be superior demons, warlocks and other evil creatures, despite being stripped of his magic and immortality, Richard treated the entire proceedings with his usual cavalier attitude, apparently oblivious to the danger he was in. When he was eventually found guilty, Richard, in one of the character's few serious moments revealed that he retained his magic and had gone along with the entire trial for momentary amusement, describing the tribunal as "Lesser Demons" and casually slew the entire courtroom, with the exception of the mortally wounded Judge. Richard told the Judge that he followed no code or orders but his own and warned him against any further interference in his life, before opening a portal and simply walking away.

It has since been revealed that Richard's meeting with Cale was no accident, and that the warlock was charged with protecting Cale. It has also been revealed, in comic 422, that Richard may not be undead at all after Cale saw his face without its veil.  Without his veil, Richard speaks with white text boxes, though he may have been simply mocking Cale.

In the 452nd issue, Richard was shown painting his human colored skin white. In addition to this, Richard has most recently been seen bleeding and wounded in the leg by an arrow (stating 'this is not the time for this' and showed pain by limping, apparently rectified subsequently by incinerating a group of "innocents", after which his power is apparently restored when he is stabbed by a soldier after pouring the ashes of the slain villagers into a bag).

Richard has recently revealed, in an uncharacteristically candid moment, that he is slowly turning human and that this has something to do with the return of his memories referenced during his trial in another dimension. Another recent strip has shown Richard bowing to an entity known as "The Innocent," which takes on a form unique to the viewer that represents their own innocence (i.e., in Cale's case it appeared as his younger self). In comic 580, Richard is seen shedding a tear as the entity appears to him as a large rose.

Benn'Joon
Benn'Joon, or Benny for short, is a priestess that Richard and Cale meet while seeking a healer. Her exact race is unknown to most, though she has been referred to as a troll. It was earlier stated by Rojave that she is a half-breed.

Benny was presumably born and lived in the dungeons of Legara until being rescued by a fellow prisoner, Krunch. "Adopted" by Krunch she was raised among the Bloodrage Clan and frequently called his "green kid" or "Gid". Later in life Benny returned to Legara to study as a priestess, where she met and fell in love with a young man named Sayl. When Sayl's father, the Thief Guild's leader Rojave, discovered their plan to leave Legara for a simple life in the country he attempted to stop them by using his authority to marry Benny himself. Sayl challenged his father for her hand but was accidentally decapitated in the fight by Rojave, who formalized his marriage to Benny as punishment to her for Sayl's death. Benny then made a deal with Temmet Aelloon to get out of Legara in exchange for her seeking out the legendary Sword of Truth. At some point, just before Benny met Cale and Richard, Aelloon's patience with her search wore out. Recently, returning to Legara once again, Benny confronted Rojave. She was initially beaten in combat and, just before being killed by him, Rojave was killed by Benny's friends. She resurrected Rojave while telling the group her story, only to immediately kill him when he was fully healed. Benny and Cale became closer after the defeat of the Northern Tribes by the Legarans when Cale saved her uncle Rayd from the dwarves and refused to believe her father was dead, eventually becoming lovers.  She has, however, become irritated by what she sees as his over-protectiveness (namely taking Dorel with him through the Portal instead of her).  When Cale and the Bloodrage returned, she asked where her father was.  Upon seeing Krunch was dead she tried to bring him back before being stopped by her uncle Rayd.  She shut herself off for two months studying.  She admits she blames Cale for Krunch's death, she also admits she's not fair in the thought.  It has recently been revealed that her mother is actually Tah'vraay of the Sisters  though for reasons unknown this has been deliberately withheld from her by Tah'vraay and Krunch.  Benny's biological father is still unknown though she has been called a half-troll on several occasions.

Benny is a talented priestess; heal both minor and serious wounds, resurrect others after their death (though she can only do this within a short window of time after their deaths,) and create powerful magical shields in combat. (At one point she and Cale survive being immersed in lava by being under one of these shields.) Benny is also a highly skilled warrior trained by the Bloodrage Clan. She usually takes a pragmatic cynical view of the world.

Her name is presumably a play on the title of the 1993 film Benny & Joon.

Krunch Bloodrage
Krunch is the youngest son of the Bloodrage's chief. His older brother, Ray'd Bool, is the Bloodrage's war leader. The deceased troll warlord, Lord Stoll, inquired as to whether Krunch was "the warrior or the scholar", with Krunch later admitting to being the scholar.

Krunch had previously been captured by the Legarans and placed in their dungeons before meeting the group. It was there that he met Benn'Joon. With her in tow he escaped the dungeons and returned to his people, "adopting" Benny as his daughter, who in turn affectionately refers to Krunch as "Old Cow." Krunch quarreled frequently with his father, a staunch believer in "empirical" expansion, and left the tribe sometime in the past for reasons unexplained (Benny cryptically stated it was because of her, but specific motivations are still unknown). They reconciled, but Krunch was still wary of his father's ambition. Although he possesses great strength and battle prowess, Krunch has shown himself to be highly intelligent judging by his obvious education and linguistic ability. In the printed version book cover he's seen reading a book while the rest of the group engage in fierce combat.

In his first appearance Krunch tackled a dragon and broke its neck. Krunch has taken a fairly neutral side in the "good/evil" debate that is, essentially, Cale and Richard's relationship. While Cale believes strongly in good and Richard equally strongly in evil, Krunch believes that people do what they must to survive and everything is, in essence, relative. Due to his secular nature and the fact that he is generally able to give logical reasoning to his beliefs, Cale often looks to him for truth and advice. Krunch often refers to Cale as "Pinky", most likely due to Cale's skin tone. Krunch suffers from aquaphobia and will only travel by boat or ship so long as he is thoroughly strapped to the deck. After discovering Legara's plans to invade the Northern Territories, and his own father's accidental duplicity in that (the Legarans tricked him into attacking his neighbors), Krunch worked as the chief mediator in getting the tribes back and working together to resist the Legarans.

Upon the death of his father, Krunch "went into a rage the likes of which I've never seen before", according to Ray'd's recounting - tearing apart several of the attacking Black Dwarves (Builders). For some time it was believed that Krunch, along with the other members of the "Northern Alliance", had either taken refuge in the Sister's fortress or been killed. Benny, Cale and Pella managed to rescue Ray'd from the Black Dwarves and traveled to Mechastone, where it was hoped that any survivors may have fled after the fall of Bloodrage Island. It was there that Krunch was found alive, and tearfully reunited with his adopted daughter and older brother.

Krunch later led the Bloodrage clan alongside Cale and Richard on an invasion of Legara. During the siege of the palace, Krunch's throat was cut by Tavor, the King of Legara. When his body was returned to Kethenecia, Benny tried to bring him back to life, but failed. It is implied that she knew the attempt would fail before she even began, but needed to attempt resurrecting him in order to find emotional closure. Krunch's body was wrapped and adorned with a golden mask (akin to Egyptian mummies) and then cremated.

Pella
Pella of Clan Breem is a dwarven fighter from old Kethenecia as well as the youngest child and only daughter of the Commander of the Kethenecian Royal Guard. After the death of her brothers in the war against the Vullii, Pella was given the choice of which path to follow: the axe (a warrior) or the lute (a bard). After a moment of consideration, Pella decided she liked the feel of both.

Sometime later, when Cale and friends were sent to bring Kethenecia to the present, Pella was assigned to guide them to the city catacombs under the orders of the Archmage. She aided the heroes in holding off the Vullii and releasing the city from its temporal anchor, later deciding to travel with the Group to the present. Pella has since stayed with the party ostensibly as she "has nowhere else to go." Sometime later she learned that her clan, Clan Breem, had been corrupted, renamed The Black Dwarves and was serving the King of Legara as his Builders.
It has since been revealed that she is actually an agent of both the Guardian and the Archmage of Kethenecia, who foresaw Cale's coming and his purpose in the city's future. Pella was secretly recruited by the Archmage to be Cale's bodyguard so she may protect Cale from his enemies, himself, and his friends. An exceptional fighter as well as an enthusiastic singer, Pella is known to sing love songs to her enemies while dismembering and/or killing them. Her fondness for violence and her dry, somewhat brutal wit earned her Richard's affection almost immediately. When Richard was banished by the Sisters, he ultimately came back by a shaman calling upon him to possess Pella's body and have his body separate from hers physically.  Later on, to force Toyk and the gnomes to abandon Mechastone and follow Cale to Kethenecia, Pella blew up Mechastone's Geared Tower killing the gnome sentries in the process, feeling it was for the greater good.  Though the gnomes never found out who blew the tower Cale figured it out and later confronted her about it, telling Pella he had expected much better of her and that if she ever attempted to murder any other allies for "the greater good" he would stop her.

Presumably, Pella was the crafter of Ray'd's metal arm. This would mean that not only does she possess the expected blacksmith ability of a dwarf, but the mechanical ingenuity of a gnome. She at one time needed to borrow the furnace of a blacksmith (who suspiciously resembled Jamie Hyneman) to forge armor to rescue Cale from Legara's dungeon, further proving her skill as a blacksmith. She recently forged a pair of swords for Cale (out of the sword of truth), which can shoot fireballs similar to Richard's signature magic. However these appear to be somewhat unreliable as someone used them to set themselves on fire by accident and they didn't work at one stage. However reforging a magical artifact presumably takes prodigious skill.

 Supporting cast General Temmet Aelloon (deceased) of the King's Legion is the first adversary the group has had to face. He wants the Sword of Truth as payment for a debt Benny owes him, and is hunting her relentlessly until she retrieves it for him. In his initial appearance, the then-Commander Aelloon was only shown to directly command a few men.  Later, he was shown to have control of a number of ships, dragons, and men.  Temmet has declared "I am Legara." on at least one occasion. This may be a reference to the phrase "L'État, c'est moi," which is attributed to Louis XIV of France. Even later, Aellon is promoted for "subduing the east". Judging by his comments, the Lord Commander of the army that attacked the North is Aelloon's father. Later, a group of soldiers are saying that the Commander was missing. It was speculated that Aelloon killed him, but later on, the Commander is revealed to have survived and defected from the Legion with a significant number of loyal soldiers at his side, and pledged himself to the service of Kethenecia. Due to an earlier attack on the Bloodrage tribe that left its leader, Chief Bloodrage, Krunch and Ray'd's father, killed, he was immediately met with hostility until Cale helped them get over their differences and work together in the battle against the Legion. In comic 694, he claims that Benny is the villain, and is trying to defend his empire from her.Chief Engineer Toyk is the gnomish leader of Mechastone and an apparent genius. He contracted the party to assassinate Lord Stoll in exchange for the location of the Sword of Truth. He later has Tim the troll deliver a message to Cale and the Bloodrage to state that the Gnomes will aid them in the battle against the Legarans. During the battle, directly after the Chief Bloodrage is assassinated, he is seen holding his arm and pronouncing "The day is lost." He was assumed dead or in the Sisters' fortress. However, it was revealed that Toyk - along with Tim and Krunch - survived the battle for Bloodrage Island and retreated to Mechastone, which came under siege by the Black Dwarves. Cale invited Toyk to flee with him to Kethenecia, but Toyk refuses, believing that it would be suicide to break through the siege. However, he and his people are forced to do so after Pella secretly blows up their watch tower.Lord Stoll (deceased) was formerly a warlord commanding an army of trolls. Stoll attempted to capture the gnome city of Mechastone so he could take advantage of its ore supplies. His invasion failed when a gnome attack distracted his guards long enough for Krunch to assassinate him. Although his second-in-command took over, his army was still wiped out by Cale's band and the gnomes.Styx is Lord Stoll's second in command, and is assumed to have taken control of the troll forces after Stoll was assassinated. When he captured Cale's party, he brings them to see Stoll. Whether he believed their story or was hoping they would kill Stoll so he could take command is unknown. Recently, he appeared as part of the North Alliance. He was recently shown to be alive, along with Tim.Chief Bloodrage (deceased) was the leader of the Bloodrage tribe and father of both Ray'd and Krunch. He often added a "heh" to whatever he said. The kingdom of Legara offered him dominion over the North in exchange for weakening the defenses of his neighbors - the Sisters, the barbarian tribes, and the giants, to name a few.  The truth is revealed later: The Lord Commander of the King's Legion remarked that he had hoped, by the Bloodrage softening up the other Northlanders, that the Bloodrage would "fall in line" (in other words, swear allegiance to Legara) when the Legion came in force and said that he and the Chief were "two old men with visions of conquest". The Chief's reply was that visions change, and when asked to what, he replied "Defense" - implying that the Chief had seen his error and had decided to turn on the Legarans who had used him, allying with the gnomes, the trolls, and the Sisters against the King's Legion.  As he prepared for battle against the Legion, his sons helped him into his armor while he gave a monologue identical to that given by King Théoden in The Two Towers, the second Lord of the Rings film; Krunch answers "How did it come to this?" by pointing out that it was the Chief's fault because he had allied with Legara and weakened the other Northlanders (to which the Chief rewarded him with a punch to the head).

During the battle on Bloodrage Island, the Chief was killed by one of the Black Dwarves (the Builders); he told Krunch that "the Bloodrage must continue", then choked out his last breath on his habitual chuckle.  Holding his dying father in his arms propelled Krunch into a fury which he started by ripping the head, spine, and arm off his father's killer with his bare hands.  The Lord Commander of the Legion comments after the battle that he had "buried his oldest friend", likely referring to Chief Bloodrage.Tim is an incredibly stupid, large troll. Tim is a former recruit of Lord Stoll's army. His mental state is attributed to "one too many mace blows to the head". He drools incessantly, because he is either perpetually hungry or simply cannot control himself. He seems to have bonded with Cale instantly, calling him his chicken and occasionally trying to eat or lick him. He also refers to Richard as "Squishy" as he squished his head the first time they met. Cale later asks Tim to "Save the Chicken", prompting Tim to join the battle on the gnomes' side in order to save Cale. He is apparently skilled in unarmed combat, as he compensates his lack of style with brute force. Upon Tim's reunion with Cale, he grabs Cale in a bear hug and licks his head. He apparently had a message for Cale, but he had eaten it.  He has since continued to travel with Cale. During the battle of Bloodrage Island, Tim was seen charging into the battle with Sooba. He was presumed dead or taking refuge in the Sisters' fortress. Tim is seen to be alive and well.Captain Tah'vraay was the Captain of "The Father's Bones," a pirate ship contracted by the party to take them to Kethenecia. She is a blue skinned elf with a long white braid of hair (which was later cut to a shorter style) and a wears clothing similar to that of a pirate. Her right eye is missing and the socket is crossed with two scars, this 'eye' allows her to see "dead people" or spirits,  She and Benny appear to have formed an instant dislike for each other, though they have been seen getting along well. Tah'vraay claims to have burned the granaries of the King, which has incurred the pursuit of the Legion. She had some kind of non-aggression arrangement with Commander Aelloon, but the latest attack by the Legion on her ship was merely to get to Benny and her friends.  Tah'vraay is the daughter of the Matron of the Sisters, a race of mage or priest-like women who reside in the area outside of Legara, though for reasons as yet unknown she chose a life of freebooting rather than religion, only recently returning to her people to help in the war. After she had been captured by Aelloon and thrown into the Dungeons of Legara Cale was sent to free her as part of the deal to get The Sisters to assist the North in war with the Legarans.  When Cale reached Tah'vraay she revealed to Cale that her 'capture' was deliberate on her part as a means to prepare and lead "The Sons of Exile", a separated male faction of the Sisters imprisoned in the dungeons, to reunite with and assist the latter in war. She and her army arrived too late to the battle, however. After arriving, she informs Cale she is leaving to fulfill her obligation to reunite the Sons with the Sisters. When he asks "What about the North?" she replies that it is done while shedding a tear.  She then takes the Sons to reunite with the Sisters and her mother, and then reunites with Cale and his companions when they come to the Sisters Temple.  It has recently been revealed that Tah'vraay is in fact the mother of Benny, a fact known only to Krunch but deliberately withheld from Benny herself.Ray'd Bool Bloodrage is Krunch's brother, regarded as the warrior to Krunch's scholar. Like the Tauren race of World of Warcraft, he greets the party after their introduction with the phrase "Well met." He is the war leader of the Bloodrage tribe, and is firmly loyal to his father the chief. Under the chief's orders, Rayd's warbands have provoked multiple other parties in the northern region. His name is a clear reference to the energy drink Red Bull, a beverage which Sohmer, the writer of LFG, repeatedly expresses affection for in his blog posts. After Ray'd knocks off a giant's leg, as the giant falls, Benny says "Ray'd Bool gives you wings",  which is also a reference to the well-known Red Bull slogan "Red Bull gives you wings." This namesake is further expressed by the two wing-like markings on Ray'd's back. He was recently found grievously injured and has lost an arm due to wounds. Although Benny could heal most of his wounds, his arm was already too far gone for her to re-attach it.  His missing arm has since been replaced with a metal one. After his father's death, Ray'd became the chieftain of the Bloodrage. At Krunch's urging, in order to give his people a sense of purpose, Ray'd declared his allegiance to Cale as King of Kethenecia.Dorel Chief shaman and mystic of the Bloodrage.  Accompanied Ray'd and his war party in raiding the Legaran base and subsequently freeing Cale and the group.  Was the first to discover Cale and Bennys relationship (apart from Richard who thought Cale was hurting Benny).  Chosen to accompany Cale, along with Richard into the Portal to seek the way to Kethenecia.The Archmage of Kethenecia is an old man, and a seer. Of questionable morals, he intended the city of Kethenecia to survive the millennia by shifting it into the future when the final attack of an alliance of many races was at Kethenecia's gates. By the man's own words, he cared nothing about the survival of Kethenecia's citizens because he had already foreseen that the nation would fall, the city would burn, its people be slaughtered, and because it was prophesied. He ordered the general of the Kethenecian homeguard to have his men slaughter all foreign soldiers and mercenaries in a surprise attack, as he was certain that the foreign parts of the Kethenecian army would turn against the homeguard and ally themselves with the advancing enemy army, because many of the foreign soldiers came from countries that had been conquered by the Vulii and their allies in the interim. The Archmage gave Cale the task to go down to the catacombs and "loosen the anchor." Unfortunately, as Cale found out, the "anchor" was in the form of a small child, and the Archmage's order translated into killing the boy. It was later revealed, after Cale had 'killed' the boy and left, that the young boy was actually the Archmage himself in a magical disguise. The Archmage later traveled forward to the present date, witnessing what he sees as a new age for Kethenecia. It has recently been revealed that Richard's bunny is actually the Archmage in disguise.  He mentions that the war of the North was not supposed to happen.
Richard stated that the Archmage looked "familiar" when first encountering him. This could mean that Richard's origins go as far back as Kethenecia. It has been revealed that Richard may already know (and perhaps has known all along) that his bunny is the Archmage. On page 430 the Legion is seen opening a portal using a skull with three gems on it, whether this is the Archmages skull or not has yet to be stated but the magic required to open a portal make it very likely.The Guardians of Eight are the guardians of the catacombs under the city of Kethenecia. Eight man-sized, wingless dragons of old which were revealed in Krunch's story as the ones who originally bred mankind from cavemen, and dreamed of flying. The guardians may be thousands of years old, as their leader says "For too long did we attempt to shape the land around us into a force of righteousness and purity. Kethenecia was to be a beacon of Justice. Instead it is a farce." The guardian leader, who carries the Sword of Truth, believes they have failed, and wants the experiment to end. They have been seen as working with the Archmage.Tavor was the last prince of the ancient elven kingdom of Gamlon and owner of the twin swords which show the map to Kethenecia. He was the first person Cale encountered during his trip back in time, and the two became fast friends. As Gamlon fell, Tavor displayed his dedication to duty, as well as his sense of personal honor. He was tasked by his father the king to "Bathe [his] blades in blood and avenge [his people] in Kethenecia," because the powerful nation of Kethenecia, ally of Gamlon and self-proclaimed beacon of justice, had refused to come to their aid. His final act in life was to shield his little sister, Princess Leena, from enemy arrows using his own body. As he lay dying, he entrusted his swords to Cale.

Later, when Cale and the rest of the group reached present-day Kethenecia (a desert-mirage in the Kethenecia wastelands, floating in another dimension), Tavor reappeared and explaining that his duty to protect the Princess and his oath to avenge Gamlon had not ended with his death. He joined the group in hopes that he may finally complete his task. For a time, Tavor got along with the rest of the group almost as well as he got along with Cale. There seemed to be much understanding between him and Krunch, and Tavor even seemed to respect Richard. However, upon arriving in Kethenecia in the past of 3,000 years ago, Tavor was so angered at the city's Archmage for allowing the destruction of Gamlon that he drew his swords and prepared to slice the old man's throat. He was stopped in this effort by Richard who froze him solid in a large chunk of ice (after Tavor said "Not a soul among you can stop me," prompting Richard's, "No one puts Richard in a corner!") and taken away by the Kethencian homeguard.

Tavor later returned with the Sword of Truth in hand, in a state of merciless rage, to attack the group in the catacombs under the city (having apparently betrayed them to the enemy alliance, because he was leading an attack force of Vulii soldiers). He apparently also slaughtered all the eight draconic guardians of the labyrinth, because the dragon leader wielded the Sword of Truth. Tavor drops the severed head of the dragon leader before he confronts Cale. Tavor's anger is exclusively directed against Cale, however, his words suggested that he views Cale as the traitor against Gamlon for going along with the Archmage's plan to "loosen the anchor," shifting the city into another dimension and setting it adrift for 3000 years. Tavor intends that the corrupt city of Kethenecia shall stay in his time and fall forever, its name forgotten, and its inhabitants pay for generations for their leader's crime of betraying Gamlon. Cale, seeing that this could mean there was still hope in saving Kethenecia, killed the child who served as the anchor, before Tavor could kill him, and shifted Kethenecia forward. Tavor did not accompany the city in the shift and his fate is currently unknown.

Recently it has been later revealed that after the battle of Kethenecia, Tavor was taken as a war prisoner by the Legion for his failure and was promptly left to die from natural exposure, but somehow he managed to loosen the bonds and make it to the palace, where he killed the former King of Legara and avenged his fallen people. When confronted by soldiers, Tavor expected to be executed right there but ended up being crowned the new king instead. Soon after that, Tavor, who has gone visibly older at this time, led a second assault on Kethenecia, this time to get back at Cale and his friends for preventing him from bringing about the legendary city's demise, killing Krunch by slitting his throat. He is apparently somewhat immortal, having regenerated a large hole in his chest nearly instantly. However, after engaging an intense sword battle with Cale over Krunch's death, Cale eventually overcame him (despite embarrassing interference from Richard) by using the magic embedded in his twin blades, initially forged from the Sword of Truth, to trap Tavor in a crystallized mixture of fire and ice. Tavor was then killed by Richard, who broke through the crystal block and took the crown of Legara; the last that was seen of "the Ageless King" was smoke rising from the blood-spattered crystal.Leena/The Shriek was a young princess of the long gone elven kingdom of Gamlon. During an attack on her homeland by an empire of evil elves known as the Vulii, her entire people were slaughtered and she was whisked away to magical catacombs where her spirit was preserved, becoming the Shriek. She is the only creature who knows the exact location of Kethenecia and the Sword of Truth. She transports Cale back in time to witness her father's and her own death. While back in time, Cale acquires two swords, belonging to Tavor, which show the map to Kethenecia when coated in blood. Just recently however Cale had discovered Leena, alive and fully grown and leading the Knights of the Way. Her soul (The Shriek) and body (The girl) having been reunited and rejuvenated in the catacombs as a result of Cale's last encounter.The Keeper of The Way is a creature strongly resembling Dungeons & Dragons' beholder- a grotesque floating head with one central eye and many separate eyes on stalks that protrude from many places on its body.  It appears to guard time itself, saying that it was "tasked with ensuring that continuity is preserved". Benny observes that the keeper may be insane, and this is evidenced by its repeated "thus it was written, thus it shall be" and it is staring at a wall for no apparent reason. It is revealed that the keeper, along with the Archmage, is using the main characters as pawns in an effort to change the time line. Their exact agenda is unknown, but it seems to involve Cale becoming a king.Lord Hctib Elttil''' ("Little Bitch" backwards), a small red imp who formerly served the position of Richard's familiar. He wears white gloves and red pants, similar to earlier styles of Mickey Mouse. When excited about something, Hctib will often exclaim "Eeeeeeeeeeeeeee!" and usually speaks without using spaces in his sentences. Hctib appears to be unaware of the significance of his name, something that his followers did not have the heart to tell him about. Richard's recollection of him includes his referring to him as 'traitorous', and admitting that he had chosen the Imp's name as he was looking for something that "would define what his role in our partnership would be", though when re-encountered, Richard shows a fondness towards Hctib similar to a long lost pet or favorite toy. Hctib was once the leader of a reluctant army of goblin-like warriors, demons and elementals assembled so as to take his vengeance upon Richard and claim a kingdom of his own; the imp's intent was to make Richard "know what I endured."<ref>[http://lfgcomic.com/page/89 Looking For Group, Vol.3, Pg.1]</ref> It seems one of the only reasons his forces followed him is because of his great dental insurance for employees. Hctib's plan for revenge led him to use a magical talisman to shrink Richard down to the size of a child, which is about the same size as Hctib himself.  Hctib's plan was foiled when the curse was broken by Richard committing an act of selflessness (protecting a child from death), regaining his size and powers as well as dismissing Hctib back to the Demonic Plane. His last words were "can't we all just get along?" a phrase uttered by the Warlock's imp minion in World of Warcraft when ordered to attack; a reference to the popular MMORPG. Hctib seems not to notice that his name is "Little Bitch" spelled backwards, and is referred to many times.

It appears that Hctib survived his banishment (another reference to World of Warcraft, as a warlock's minion is never destroyed, but returns to the demon plane). In an ironic twist, Hctib was selected to be Richard's legal counsel in page 150, during the latter's trial in the "Plane of Suck."  When Richard inevitably slaughtered the demons present at his trial, he leaves Hctib alive, despite how Hctib went out of his way to have Richard declared guilty. Hctib apparently heard Richard's confession to the judge and still seems to be in the "Plane of Suck."

Bunny: When Richard was shrunk by Hctib's amulet, the rest of the party gave him a bunny mount as a joke. In the next strip Richard was seen riding the bunny into battle, and the party seems to have adopted it as a pet. Richard has also taken a liking to the bunny, carrying it and treating it as a loved pet. This feeling appears to be reciprocated by the bunny in comic 147 as it is seen shedding a tear when Richard was banished. Also, when reunited in comic 173, both show affection by leaping into each other's arms.
The bunny has been seen transforming into the Archmage, apparently meaning that the bunny is actually the Archmage in disguise. When the bunny returned from his transformation as the Archmage, Richard is seemingly oblivious to this and is seen hugging it after worrying about its earlier absence.  However, Richard later reveals he has known about the bunny's true identity for a long time and offers the services of his undead village as an army to protect Kethenecia. According to page 169, there is a possibility the bunny is the master of The Sisters and the Exiled Sons (thus meaning that the Archmage and the Beholder control the sisters and brothers).

Maikos is a villager from the "little village up the coast" ruled by Richard. When asked why Richard must go to the village, Maikos reveals that it is the source of Richard's power; Richard tries to cover this up by saying that "I pushed his mother off a tower" (which Maikos, held on the ground by Richard's foot, replies "That too"). Journeying to the village to find it beset by the Legion and by missionaries trying to "save" the townsfolk, Richard says to Maikos "this is no time for masks" - at which point, Maikos and the other villagers reveal themselves to be undead. As a sidenote, the undead villagers seem to possess potent restorative abilities, shown when one man gets his arm severed and reattaches it, and when another does the same with his head. Although odd, seeing as Richard and Maikos seem to require the services of healers to restore their wounds and reattach severed limbs, it could be because they were not near the Source of Richard's powers. This, however has not been confirmed.

Shora is Cale's wife, apparently killed by his master to force Cale along to his destiny. She made her first appearance in the portal to Kethenecia as an apparition. In a flashback of Cale's she and Cale first met when they were young, when Cale was attempting to be a hero. This attempt ended with both Cale and Shora wounded, though they were saved by Richard. Shora then becomes part of Cale's monastery. She appears to be the first owner of Sooba. The master's last words to her were "I must ensure he never returns. Or has reason to." It is revealed in the next strip that Shora's murder was part of a plot to drive Cale out into the world and fulfil his destiny, which appears to have happened directly before the first page, meaning that Cale had just witnessed his wife's "betrayal" (as she had been forced to cheat on him by Cale's master) immediately before the comic began.

The Phares are a group of physical representations of the elements fire, water, earth, and air. They first appeared in Issue 4 when they were attacking a small village suffering from a drought. Cale and his group were called upon to cease the mysterious attacks and while Krunch and Benny were occupied with holding off the Phares, Cale and Pella discovered that a young village boy named Jarl was the cause behind the appearance of the Phares. The Phares revealed that they themselves were responsible for creating life upon the Earth, and before entering a deep slumber, they tasked the living races in taking care of the things they created, only awakening in great emergency. In order to remain undisturbed, the Phares imbued themselves into various ancient artifacts - one of which was a chalice. They were awakened when the chalice was unearthed by Jarl during a search for water and upon contact possessed him. Through him, the Phares explained that they were informed of how the people started mistreating the Earth and decided to take action to wipe them out (it was revealed that Hctib had told them); however Cale told them that they were merely misinformed and failed as guardians of the Earth. The Phares tried to kill everyone out by summoning a flood but were stopped by Richard who, after some "persuasion" from Cale, took the chalice from Jarl and used his powers to freeze the flood, while freeing the boy from his possession.

Spin-off comics

Non-Player Character
Non-Player Character, or NPC, debuting on January 3, 2014, is a spin-off series made of short stories focusing on the background of various supporting characters, some of which only appeared on one page in the main comic. Like the main story, it is written by Sohmer. The first six stories were drawn by Mohammad "Hawk" Haque, but since then each story is done by a unique artist. New pages are published each Tuesday and Friday.  However the comic went on break late in 2016 and has had no new updates since.

Tiny Dick Adventures
Tiny Dick Adventures debuted on 19 February 2014. It is written by Sohmer and drawn by Ryan Dunlavey. The non-canon comic is made of short humorous strips featuring a miniature version of Richard in a contemporary setting, often reacting on recent events or ongoing trends. New strips were released each Wednesday. Blind Ferret published 2 print volumes of the series. On 21 February 2019, Dunlavey announced that the comic was on an indefinite hiatus.

Film & other Media

Movie & Preview Videos 
On August 6, 2007, Ryan Sohmer posted a video link in his blogs on the homepage of Looking For Group. The video, entitled "Slaughter your World," features Richard, voiced by Dave B. Mitchell, singing a parodied version of the song "Part of Your World" from Disney's The Little Mermaid. It is revealed at the end and in the blog that the video is actually a teaser trailer for "a full 75-90 minute feature film."  The film, currently under the working title of "Looking For Group: The Origins of Dick" with an original release date of 2008, but has since been moved to TBA status.  On June 6, 2010, a super moderator of the forums  confirmed that the movie is "still in the works" with no set release date as yet. Throughout late 2010, when many members of the LFG forum were expecting word on the film, there were rumors that the film was "in development hell". These rumors were never responded to.

The first teaser trailer shows Richard slaughtering an entire village. It was the most watched video on YouTube for many days after its initial release and has altogether been watched over seven million times. Within days, the video had become so popular that fans made numerous requests to be able to purchase the song. On August 19, it was announced on the LFG Forum that a mp3 download version of the Slaughter Your World would be available for a small fee.

A second teaser trailer called LFG: This is War was released in December 2008, and features Richard and Cale in battle while singing a parodied version of the song "A Whole New World" from Disney's Aladdin, which when paired with the previous "Slaughter your World" trailer suggests that Disney parodies might be a frequent occurrence in the movie. Cale tries to save some innocents and kills an attacking troll, while Richard kills the innocents and reveals that he started the war and would happily fight for either side.

On May 3, 2012, it was confirmed that the movie was still in the works, just slowed by government subsidies.

Merchandise 
A limited edition collectible figurine of Richard was released for sale on 15 November 2007. The figurine was limited to 500 pre-orders, and sold out within 24 hours. The webmaster described the event as "--an eventful full day filled of near server explosions".

Video Game 
On March 2 of 2008, Sohmer announced that they might be coming out with a video game. On June 26, 2013, a video was released advertising a kickstarter for it. It is currently being called "Left for Group: The Fork of Truth".

Board Game 
Released in 2016 and designed by Ryan Costello, Orphans & Ashes is a fast-paced two-player tile-laying game with push-your-luck and dexterity elements that plays in 45–60 minutes.

Players take on the role of one of two popular Looking for Group characters, Cale and Richard, as they stumble upon an orphanage that has caught fire and is burning down. The aim for Cale is to rescue orphans from the burning building while Richard aims to use one of his special abilities to harvest their souls before the fire gets them.

Every turn is divided into two phases: the action phase and the fire phase. During the action phase, players use a range of actions with which to explore the orphanage, put out fires and either rescue or incinerate the orphans found within. The fire phase is when the players spread the fire around the board. Placement of fire is governed by a set of "immutable rules".

Cale's player will use a partially dexterity based mechanic to rescue the orphans by balancing and hooking the miniatures onto Cale's character model. Cale's arms are designed to hook onto the orphans' hands, allowing our elven hero to carry the orphans he saves with him.

Richard uses the red fire pawns that, like the yellow fire pawns going around the orphanage, clip to the base of the pawns they set on fire.

Awards 
 On June 14, 2008, the comic was awarded the Joe Shuster Award for Outstanding Canadian Web Comics Creators for both Looking for Group and Least I Could Do.  Lar DeSouza accepted the award on behalf of himself and Ryan Sohmer.
 On August 9, 2009, the artist, Lar de Souza, was awarded the Prix Aurora Award for Artistic Achievement for Looking for Group.

References 

All comic page numbers for LFG reference the pages as presented on the website.  The pages in the print issues are unnumbered.

External links 

 Looking for Group

2000s webcomics
2006 webcomic debuts
Fantasy webcomics
Parody webcomics
Video game webcomics
Canadian webcomics
2010s webcomics
Canadian comedy websites